Herman Schmitz co-wrote the song Patrick mon chéri (1975), along with Peter Koelewijn and Will Hoebee. This song was performed by the duo of which he was part, Kiki and Pearly. The song was covered by French singer Sheila, who had a French number-one hit with it in 1976.

Herman started his music career as the guitar player of Tagrag.

External links
Herman Schmitz composer listing
Patrick Mon Chéri single (Sheila)
Patrick Mon Chéri single (Kiki & Pearly)
Dutch singles Chart 1970-1979

Possibly living people
Year of birth missing
French composers
French male composers